The Schneider ES-52 Kookaburra is an Australian two-seat training sailplane of the 1950s and 1960s.  It was designed by Edmund Schneider, the designer of the Grunau Baby, who had emigrated to Adelaide, South Australia following the end of the Second World War.

The Kookaburra is a cantilever high-winged monoplane of wooden construction, with staggered side-by-side seating under a perspex canopy. The first example flew on 20 June 1954. It was available in both short and long wingspan versions and was widely used by Australian gliding clubs in the 1960s.

Variants
ES-52 Mk.I
Initial production, 4 built.
ES-52 Mk.II
Eleven built.
ES-52 Mk.III
Eight built.
ES-52 Mk.IV
17 built by 1964.
ES-52B
A  span version of the Kookaburra with a completely revised three piece wing. Four aircraft built.

Specifications (ES 52 Mk.IV)

Notes

See also 
 Schneider Grunau Baby
 Schneider ES-59 Arrow
 Schneider ES-60 Boomerang
 Schneider ES-65 Platypus

References

External links
MK IV Kookaburra - VH-GNZ.

1950s Australian sailplanes
Glider aircraft
Edmund Schneider aircraft
Aircraft first flown in 1952
High-wing aircraft